The MTV Video Music Award for Viewer's Choice was first awarded at the first annual MTV Video Music Awards in 1984. Until 1994, the Viewer's Choice award nominees were the same as the Video of the Year nominees.  In 1995 MTV created a separate set of nominees for Viewer's Choice and Video of the Year (although, TLC's "Waterfalls" won both that year). This continued for the rest of the award's history.

As the name indicated, the winner was decided by audience members, who could vote up until the very night of the show via phone calls and, later on, internet votes and text messages.  This award was last given out at the 2006 ceremony, in which all general categories became fan-voted, seemingly rendering the award redundant.  The following year, MTV revamped the VMAs and eliminated the Viewer's Choice award, permanently transferring its voting procedures over to the Best New Artist award.

Aerosmith is the biggest winner of this award, having won it three times.  Also, only four acts—INXS, Aerosmith, TLC, and Green Day—have won both the Video of the Year and Viewer's Choice awards on the same year (though Green Day won each award with a different video in 2005).

References

MTV Video Music Awards
Awards established in 1984
Awards disestablished in 2006